Pulvinic acids are natural chemical pigments found in some lichens, derived biosynthetically from the aromatic amino acids phenylalanine and tyrosine, via dimerization and oxidative ring-cleavage of arylpyruvic acids, a process that also produces the related pulvinones.  

Hydroxypulvinic acid pigments (pulvinic acid type family of pigments) have been found in Boletus (e.g. Boletus  erythropus), Boletinus, Chalciporus, Gyrodon, Leccinum, Pulveroboletus, Suillus (e.g. Suillus luteus, Suillus bovinus, and Suillus grevillei), Paxillus (e.g. Paxillus involutus), Serpula (e.g. Serpula  lacrymans), Xerocomus (e.g. Xerocomus chrysenteron), Hygrophoropsis (e.g. Hygrophoropsis aurantiaca), Retiboletus (e.g. Retiboletus nigerrimus), Pulveroboletus (e.g. Pulveroboletus auriflammeus), and are generally characteristic of Boletales. In addition to pulvinone, derivatives and related pigments of this family include atromentic acid, xerocomic acid, isoxerocomic acid, variegatic acid, variegatorubin, xerocomorubin, chinomethide, methyl bovinate, badion A, norbadion A, bisnorbadiochinone A, pisochinone, and sclerocitrin. More complex dimers of the pulvinic acid dimer (dimers of dimers) have been found in the fungi Scleroderma citrinum and Chalciporus piperatus.

References 

Biological pigments
Carboxylic acids
Furanones
Phenyl compounds
Lichen products